The 1991 FIFA U-17 World Championship, the fourth edition of the tournament, was held in the cities of Florence, Montecatini Terme, Viareggio, Massa, Carrara, and Livorno in Italy between 16 August and 31 August 1991. Players born after 1 August 1974 could participate in this tournament.

Saudi Arabia, the 1989 champions, were not able to defend their title as they withdrew from the final round of the AFC qualifying tournament, citing the Blue Diamond Affair.

The tournament was originally to be scheduled in Ecuador, but due to the cholera outbreak earlier that year, it was moved to Italy, which hosted the previous year's World Cup. This was the second time a FIFA event was moved from its original hosting country, after the 1986 World Cup was moved from Colombia to Mexico.

Qualified Teams

1.  replacing Ecuador.

Squads
For a list of all squads that played in the final tournament, see 1991 FIFA U-17 World Championship squads

Referees 

Asia
  Omar Al-Mohanna
  Lechmanasamy Kathirveloo
  Nizar Watti
Africa
  Sylvain Abikanlou
  Rachid Ben Khadija
  Lim Kee Chong
CONCACAF
  Errol Forbes
  Miguel Angel Salas
  Arlington Success

South America
  Juan Bava
  Sabino Cespedes
  Jorge Orellano
  Ulisses Tavares da Silva
Europe
  Angelo Amendolia
  Fabio Baldas
  Jan Damgaard
  Philippe Leduc
  Leif Sundell
  Mario van der Ende
Oceania
  Ronald Gallon

Group stages

Group A

Group B
Venue: Carrara

Group C
Venue: Massa

Group D
Venue: Livorno

Knockout stages

Quarterfinals

Semifinals

Third place play-off

Final

Result

Awards

Goalscorers

Adriano of Brazil won the Golden Shoe award for scoring four goals. In total, 81 goals were scored by 59 different players, with only one of them credited as own goals.

4 goals
 Adriano
 Nii Lamptey
3 goals
 Paul Agostino
 Jorge Toledano
 Antonio Robaina
 Juan Carlos Murgui
2 goals

 Ruben Comelles
 Alex Kiratzoglu
 Gao Fei
 Goya Jaekel
 Jens Sarna
 Mohammed Gargo
 Mohamed Ahmed
 Matt McKeon

1 goal

 Christian Akselman
 Juan Sebastián Verón
 Ricardo Castellani
 Aaron Healey
 Argel
 Leandro
 Nene
 Yan
 Huang Yi
 Liang Yu
 Gaston Kibiti
 Patrick Tchicaya
 Eliezer Casamayor
 Luis Marten
 Vladimir Sánchez
 Christof Babatz
 Karl-Heinz Lutz
 Emmanuel Duah
 Nana Opoku
 Alessandro Del Piero
 Daniele Giraldi
 García
 Mario Garza
 Ahmed Bu
 Jassim Al Tamimi
 Mohamed Al Bedaid
 Ibrahim Hussein
 Khalid Elmustafa
 Nemairi Saeed
 César Palacios
 Dani
 Emilio Carrasco
 James Beattie
 José Miguel López
 Pedro Velasco Morón
 Ramón
 Adel Mohamed
 Ali Abdulrahman
 Jamal Ibrahim
 Albertin Montoya
 Brian Kelly
 Mike Dunne
 Shohn Beachum
 Diego López

Own goal
 Juan Azconzobal (playing against Australia)

Final ranking

External links
FIFA U-17 World Championship Italy 1991, FIFA.com
FIFA Technical Report (Part 1), (Part 2) and (Part 3)

FIFA U-17 World Championship
FIFA
International association football competitions hosted by Italy
FIFA U-17 World Cup tournaments
August 1991 sports events in Europe